The 2015 CAF Champions League Final was the final of the 2015 CAF Champions League, the 51st edition of Africa's premier club football tournament organized by the Confederation of African Football (CAF), and the 19th edition under the current CAF Champions League format.

The final was contested in two-legged home-and-away format between USM Alger of Algeria and TP Mazembe of Democratic Republic of the Congo. The first leg was hosted by USM Alger at the Omar Hamadi Stadium in Algiers on 31 October 2015, while the second leg was hosted by TP Mazembe at the Stade TP Mazembe in Lubumbashi on 8 November 2015. The winner earned the right to represent the CAF at the 2015 FIFA Club World Cup, entering at the quarterfinal stage, as well as play in the 2016 CAF Super Cup against the winner of the 2015 CAF Confederation Cup.

TP Mazembe won the competition for the fifth time in its history and first time since 2010, defeating USM Alger of Algeria 4–1 on aggregate.

Qualified teams
In the following table, finals until 1996 were in the African Cup of Champions Club era, since 1997 were in the CAF Champions League era.

Venues

Omar Hamadi Stadium

Omar Hammadi Stadium is a multi-purpose stadium in Bologhine, Algiers, Algeria. It is currently used mostly for football matches and is the home ground of USM Alger. The stadium has a capacity of 17,000 people.

The stadium was built in 1919 as the home ground for l’Association Sportive Saint Eugénoise. It was known as the Stade communal de Saint Eugène.

In 1957, the third platform will be built, consisting of two superimposed stands on the south side, arched and connecting the two original stands, this new platform will give a modern look at the municipal stadium.

After the independence of Algeria in 1962, the stage of St. Eugene will be called Bologhine new name for the town.

In 2000 a new stand was built to expand the home stadium capacity, and spent 8,000 to 10,000 spectators, USM Alger club that holds the concession for the stadium has also invested in the development of infrastructure necessary for recovery and training for players: sauna, gym and restaurant.

Stade TP Mazembe

Stade TP Mazembe is a multi-use stadium located in the Kamalondo suburb of Lubumbashi, Democratic Republic of the Congo.  Since its completion in 2011, it has mostly been used for football matches and is the home venue of TP Mazembe and CS Don Bosco. The stadium has 18,000 seats.

In April 2010 the construction of the new stadium of the TP Mazembe Lubumbashi club began, an enclosure that will meet the standards required by the African Football Confederation (CAF) to host international competitions, the new facilities have a VIP press room, parking for vehicles and synthetic grass.

Until 2011 the TP Mazembe made use of the Stade Frederic Kibassa Maliba.

Road to final

Note: In all results below, the score of the finalist is given first (H: home; A: away).

Format
The final was played on a home-and-away two-legged basis, with the order of legs decided by a draw, held after the group stage draw. If the aggregate score was tied after the second leg, the away goals rule would be applied, and if still level, the penalty shoot-out would be used to determine the winner (no extra time would be played).

Matches

First leg

Second leg

References

External links
Orange CAF Champions League 2015, CAFonline.com

2015
Final
TP Mazembe matches
USM Alger matches
International club association football competitions hosted by the Democratic Republic of the Congo